Sodhra Kopra railway station is located in Sodhra town, Gujranwala district of Punjab province, Pakistan.

See also
 List of railway stations in Pakistan
 Pakistan Railways

References

External links

Railway stations in Gujranwala District
Railway stations on Wazirabad–Narowal Branch Line